S. J. Sadiq Pasha is an Indian politician and former Member of the Legislative Assembly of Tamil Nadu. He was elected to the Tamil Nadu legislative assembly as a Dravida Munnetra Kazhagam candidate from Udumalpet constituency in 1967, 1971 and 1989 elections in 1977 Thousand Lights (State Assembly Constituency). He was the former Minister of Tamil Nadu from 1967 to 1976 and from 1989 to 1991.

References 

Dravida Munnetra Kazhagam politicians
Members of the Tamil Nadu Legislative Assembly
Year of birth missing
Possibly living people